Cyril is the first solo album by Dutch singer-songwriter Cyril Havermans. It was recorded in 1973 after Havermans left Dutch progressive rock band Focus. The parting was amicable and came about partly as a result of Havermans' desire to include more vocal content (Focus are primarily an instrumental band). His erstwhile band-mates contribute much instrumentation to the album.

The songs are, for the most part, short acoustic guitar driven numbers and bear little resemblance to Focus material (Havermans did not write for the band). The lyrics are in English, apart from the traditional song "The Humpbacked Flute Player".

Track listing 

All tracks composed by Cyril Havermans except where noted

"A Long Line of Goodbyes" – 2:09
"A Charm of Love Can Be" – 2:50
"Theme for an Imaginary Lady" – 4:33
"Ev'ry Day (Just For You)" – 2:40
"Share Those Dreams" – 3:01
"Get Yourself By" – 2:08
"The Humpbacked Flute Player" (traditional) – 3:18
"Lady Sad Song" – 3:30
"There's a Pain" – 2:37
"Broken Dreams" – 2:42

Personnel
 Cyril Havermans – vocals, acoustic guitar, bass guitar
 Jan Akkerman – electric guitar
 Thijs van Leer – electric piano, flute, organ
 Pierre van der Linden – drums
 John D'Andrea – piano
 Chuck Domanico – acoustic bass
 Emil Richards – percussion
 Jackie Ward – backing vocals
 Andrea Willis – backing vocals
 Maxine Willard – backing vocals

Citations

1973 debut albums
Cyril Havermans albums